Manzie is a surname. Notable people with the surname include:

Andrew Manzie (1863–1943), Australian rules football club administrator
Daryl Manzie (born 1946), Australian politician
Gordon Manzie (1930–2014), British civil servant
Jimmy Manzie, Australian musician
John Manzie (born 1947), Australian rules footballer
Stella Manzie (born 1960), British civil servant